Rohan Marwaha (born 23 April 1994) is an Indian cricketer. He made his first-class debut on 11 January 2020, for Punjab in the 2019–20 Ranji Trophy.

References

External links
 

1994 births
Living people
Indian cricketers
Punjab, India cricketers
Place of birth missing (living people)